The 1940 Notre Dame Fighting Irish football team was an American football team that represented the University of Notre Dame as an independent during the 1940 college football season. In their seventh season under head coach Elmer Layden, the team compiled a 7–2 record and outscored opponents by a total of 168 to 67.The team played its home games at Notre Dame Stadium in South Bend, Indiana.

Back Milt Piepul was the team captain. Other notable players included Steve Juzwik, Bob Saggau, Fred Evans, Steve Bagarus, and Bernie Crimmins. Saggau led the team with 650 yards of total offense, and Juzzwik led in rushing with 407 yards and in scoring with 43 points.

Schedule

References

Notre Dame
Notre Dame Fighting Irish football seasons
Notre Dame Fighting Irish football